David E. Cote (born October 28, 1960) is an American politician in the state of New Hampshire. He is a member of the New Hampshire House of Representatives, sitting as a Democrat from the Hillsborough 31 district, having been first elected in 1982. Cote currently serves as house minority leader, and ranking member on the election law and redistricting committees. He previously chaired the election law and judiciary committees. As of early 2022, he had not cast a vote or attended a House session since March 11, 2020 due to COVID health concerns.

References

1960 births
20th-century American politicians
21st-century American politicians
Democratic Party members of the New Hampshire House of Representatives
Living people
Politicians from Nashua, New Hampshire